Kittinupong Kedren (born 19 July 1996) is a Thai badminton player. He was the gold medalists at the 2014 BWF World Junior Championships in the boys' doubles event with his partner Dechapol Puavaranukroh, and later at the 2017 Southeast Asian Games in the men's doubles event.

Achievements

Southeast Asian Games 
Men's doubles

BWF World Junior Championships 
Boys' doubles

BWF International Challenge/Series 
Men's doubles

  BWF International Challenge tournament
  BWF International Series tournament

References

External links 
 

1996 births
Living people
Kittinupong Kedren
Kittinupong Kedren
Badminton players at the 2018 Asian Games
Kittinupong Kedren
Competitors at the 2017 Southeast Asian Games
Competitors at the 2019 Southeast Asian Games
Kittinupong Kedren
Kittinupong Kedren
Southeast Asian Games medalists in badminton